Hearts Like Lions was an American indie rock band, and they played an alternative rock music style. Hailing from Long Beach, California and were formed in 2011, they remained a band for the next 10 years. Their first extended play, These Hands, was released in 2014, with Tooth & Nail Records. Their single, "Stranger", broke through on the Billboard magazine Christian Rock chart.

Singer Stephen Ramos and drummer Nick Sturz have now gone on to play in their new musical endeavor called WILDER.

Background
The band is from Long Beach, California, where they formed in 2011, with lead vocalist and guitarist, Stephen Ramos, whose current members are lead guitarist and singer, Michael Grasseschi, bassist, Luke Schoepf, and drummer, Nick Sturz.  Their former band members were guitarist, Brandon Fox, bassist, Eric Rivers, keyboardist, Ariel Painschab, and drummer, Rick Raasch. They were signed to Tooth & Nail Records, in 2014.

Music history
The band commenced as a musical entity in 2011, with their first major label extended play, These Hands, that released on December 2, 2014, from Tooth & Nail Records. Their single, "Stranger", found success on the Billboard magazine Christian Rock charts, where it reached a peak of No. 2.

Members
Band members
 Stephen Danny Ramos – lead vocals, guitar
 Nick Sturz – drums
 Luke Schoepf – bass
 Michael Grasseschi - backing vocals, lead guitar
 Brendan Fox – guitar
 Garrick Fieger – bass
 Ariel Painschab – keys
 Rick Raasch – drums

Discography
Studio albums
If I Never Speak Again (February 17, 2017, Tooth & Nail)
EPs
These Hands (December 2, 2014, Tooth & Nail)
Singles

References

External links
 

Christian rock groups from California
2011 establishments in California
Musical groups established in 2011
Tooth & Nail Records artists